Reginald Purbrick (1877 – 6 November 1950) was a Conservative Party politician elected as Member of Parliament for Liverpool Walton between 1929 and 1945. He is known for asking then Prime Minister Winston Churchill, whether the Royal Air Force would consider bombing Dresden and other East German cities.

In 1925, Purbrick and his family purchased the Tahbilk winery in Australia.

References

Conservative Party (UK) MPs for English constituencies
Politicians from Liverpool
UK MPs 1929–1931
UK MPs 1931–1935
UK MPs 1935–1945
1877 births
1950 deaths